Caging may refer to:

Caging (direct mail), a practice in the direct mail industry
Voter caging, a voter suppression technique